Holy Tongue is a 2000 Italian comedy film written and directed by Carlo Mazzacurati.   It entered into the main competition at the  57th Venice International Film Festival.

Cast 

 Antonio Albanese - Antonio
 Fabrizio Bentivoglio - Willy "Alain Delon"
 Isabella Ferrari - Patrizia
 Toni Bertorelli - Krondano
 Ivano Marescotti - Dr. Ronchitelli
 Marco Paolini - Saint Antonio 
 Giulio Brogi - Maritan
 Tying Tiffany - The clerk

References

External links

2000 films
Italian comedy films
2000 comedy films
Films directed by Carlo Mazzacurati